Stanley J. Aronoff (born June 8, 1932) is an American politician of the Republican party who served for a time as president of the Ohio Senate. Aronoff was raised in a Jewish family in the North Avondale neighborhood of Cincinnati and attended high school at Walnut Hills High School. He earned a bachelor's degree and a law degree from Harvard University, after which he returned to Cincinnati to enter into the private practice of law.

In 1960, Ambrose Lindhorst (the head of the Hamilton County Republican Party), Walton Bachrach (mayor of Cincinnati), and Republican operative George Eyrich persuaded Aronoff to run for a seat in the Ohio General Assembly. He began serving in the Ohio House of Representatives in 1961 and was re-elected twice, serving until 1967.

In 1966, Aronoff won a seat in the Ohio Senate. He was reelected in 1968, and again in 1972.  In the 1974 primary election, he made an unsuccessful bid for the Republican nomination for Ohio Attorney General. He won reelection to the Senate in 1976.

In 1978, Aronoff sought the party's nomination for a seat in the United States House of Representatives, but party bosses endorsed television news broadcaster Thearon "Tom" Atkins instead. It was suspected that with the Jewish Bill Gradison already representing the Hamilton County Republican Party in Congress, that party leaders shied away from endorsing another Jew for Cincinnati's other congressional seat. Nevertheless, Aronoff prevailed in the Republican primary, but lost in the general election in a close race to Democrat Tom Luken.

By the 1980 elections, the Republican party achieved a majority in the Ohio Senate, and Aronoff was named chairman of the Finance Committee. However, the party was again in the minority two years later. In the 1984 campaign, Aronoff's success at fundraising was key to the Republican recapture of the Senate. The Senate Republican leader was Paul Gillmor, but when Gillmor won a seat in Congress in 1988, Aronoff became President of the Senate.

In 1995, Aronoff —- along with other legislators, such as Democratic Ohio House of Representatives Speaker Vern Riffe—was the subject of an investigation into "fee pancaking". The law required that legislators disclose the acceptance of a speaking fee if it is in excess of $500. "Pancaking" involved accepting fees of less than $500 from more than one source for the same event in order to avoid disclosure. Aronoff pleaded guilty to accepting $4,500 in fees from various arms of The Limited company without disclosure in violation of this law. He was sentenced to community service, which he fulfilled by giving lectures to students on government ethics.

By 1996, term limits were in effect. Aronoff was eligible to run for one more term in the Senate. However, he decided to retire from public services.  He helped found the law firm of Aronoff, Rosen and Hunt.

See also
Election Results, U.S. Representative from Ohio, 2nd District

References

External links

1932 births
Living people
Presidents of the Ohio State Senate
Republican Party Ohio state senators
Jewish American state legislators in Ohio
Politicians from Cincinnati
Jews and Judaism in Cincinnati
Harvard Law School alumni
21st-century American Jews